Serpentina is the fourth studio album by American singer and songwriter Banks, released on April 8, 2022, by AWAL. The album was preceded by the singles "The Devil", "Skinnydipped", "Holding Back", "I Still Love You", "Meteorite" and "Deadend".

Singles
Banks released the lead single "The Devil" on July 25, 2021, along with the music video the same day. This marked her first release as an independent artist after parting ways with Harvest Records.

"Skinnydipped" was released as the second single on August 25, 2021, along with a music video the same day, and a lyric video on September 7.

Banks performed "Holding Back" for the first time on Jimmy Kimmel Live! on February 24, 2022. The song was released as the album's third single the next day on February 25. The release came with the announcement of her fourth studio album, Serpentina, as well as the pre-order and tracklist the same day.

"I Still Love You" was released as the album's fourth single on March 21, 2022, as well as the music video. The same day, Banks announced standalone performance dates in May 2022, set to open up on May 25, 2022 in San Diego, then in Santa Ana on May 27, and finally Napa Valley on May 28.

"Meteorite" was released as the fifth single on April 4, 2022. Banks later announced she was embarking on The Serpentina Tour, with a set opening date in Austin on July 11, 2022.  

"Deadend" was released as the sixth single on April 6, 2022.

Critical reception

Serpentina received generally favourable reviews from music critics. At Metacritic, which assigns a normalised rating out of 100 to reviews from mainstream critics, the album has an average score of 70 based on eight reviews.

Track listing

Charts

Release history

References

2022 albums
AWAL albums
Banks (singer) albums